Robbie the Pict, also known as Brian Robertson (born 1948) is a Scottish campaigner and former Scottish Parliamentary candidate for the Highlands and Islands.

Pictish Free State
Robertson gained exposure as the leader of the Micronation of the Pictish Free State, established in 1977 as a means of promoting awareness of the Pictish culture. He was also a leading figure in the ultimately successful campaign to abolish the toll on the Skye Bridge during which he argued that the legal paperwork for the tolls was incomplete, and that consequently the tolls themselves were illegal. The toll was finally abolished in 2004 after the government bought the bridge from its private owners. Robbie the Pict also appealed unsuccessfully to Prince Charles to help overturn the criminal convictions of those who had been prosecuted for refusing to pay the toll.

The Pictish Free State was a micronation initiative started by Robbie the Pict in 1977. Apparently created to further knowledge of Pictish culture, Robertson started the project with one acre of his own land on the Isle of Skye. Since then the Pictish Free State has grown to over  through supporters donations. Robbie, under 'Pictish High Commission' auspices, has in the past been in conflict with HM Government over his use of Pictish diplomatic registration plates and non-compliance with UK laws.

Asylum and EU parliament candidacy
For a time in the early 1990s Robbie was to be found in Tallinn, Estonia where he sought political asylum. Robbie ultimately felt that he had been undermined by the influence of MI6 on the serving Estonian Minister of Foreign Affairs, Trivimi Velliste, to prevent a scenario of his being created a cause célèbre by the official granting of political asylum status - Robbie held, and still holds the belief, that Velliste's Soviet past cast a shadow on his ability to escape compromise by informed intelligence services.

Robertson was a candidate for Member of the Scottish Parliament in 1999, standing as additional member for the Highlands and Islands. He received 1,151 votes, securing 0.57% of the vote.

Speed cameras challenges
In 2006 he launched another campaign to have traffic light surveillance cameras declared illegal on the grounds that they have not been formally approved by Parliament. He was convicted in Nottingham of running through a red light. In April 2009 his appeal to the High Court in London was rejected.

In May 2009 he lost a test case in the Scottish Court of Criminal Appeal challenging the legality of speed cameras.

References

Living people
1948 births
Scottish activists
Micronational leaders
1977 establishments in Scotland
1977 in British politics
Micronations in Scotland
Pictish culture
Politics of Highland (council area)
Isle of Skye